Billy Hunter (5 June 1934 – 20 September 2016) was a Scotland international rugby union player. He played as a Lock.

Rugby Union career

Amateur career

He played rugby for Hawick High School before joining Hawick PSA and then Hawick Linden.

Hunter then joined and played for Hawick from 1952.

He went on to captain the side.

Provincial career

He first represented the Scottish Border XV in their match against Scottish Universities in 1958.

He played for South of Scotland District. He was part of the South side that beat Australia.

He was part of the North-South Provinces District side that beat Canada in 1962, scoring a try in the match.

He played for the Whites Trial side in their matches against the Blues Trial to determine international selection. He turned out for Whites in their 1st and 3rd trial matches in 1962-63 season.

International career

He was capped 7 times for Scotland. He was part of the Scotland side that drew 0-0 with New Zealand.

He played for Barbarians.

Business career

Hunter first worked in the local 'skinyards' which took raw sheepskins and prepared them for use in the woollen mills. Coupling his work there with rugby training proved problematic - and Jim Renwick recalled: "Billy was always turning up late for training and [the trainer] Hugh McLeod wasn’t best pleased. Billy protested one night that he was working at the skinworks and finished at 6pm and with training starting at half past he struggled to get down in time for the start. Well, the next day he gets home from work and there’s a bike at his door."

He moved on from the skinworks to become a manager of a slaughterhouse. Later he ran his own business running kennels and breeding dogs.

Other interests

He took up golf and had a single-figure handicap. He often played with Bill McLaren.

He bred canaries to a national standard, and won Scottish titles.

He participated in the Hawick Common Riding. In 2013 he was proud to see his son Stuart become the 'acting father' to the Cornet Ritson.

He was regularly found supporting the Hawick side as a fan, together with his friend Harry Whittaker, the former Hawick scrum-half.

References

1934 births
2016 deaths
Scottish rugby union players
Scotland international rugby union players
South of Scotland District (rugby union) players
Hawick RFC players
Hawick Linden RFC players
Hawick PSA players
Barbarian F.C. players
Provinces District (rugby union) players
Whites Trial players
Rugby union players from Hawick
Rugby union locks